Tethea oberthueri is a moth in the family Drepanidae. It is found in Burma, Nepal, Malaysia, India, China, Taiwan and also on Borneo.

Subspecies
Tethea oberthueri oberthueri (India, Burma, Nepal, Malaysia, China: Shaanxi, Zhejiang, Hubei, Hunan, Fujian, Hainan, Guangxi, Sichuan, Yunnan, Tibet)
Tethea oberthueri baluensis Werny, 1966 (Borneo)
Tethea oberthueri taiwana (Matsumura, 1931) (Taiwan)

References

Moths described in 1921
Thyatirinae